This article lists the heads of state of Serbia, from the establishment of the modern Serbian state during the Serbian Revolution to the present day.

The list includes the heads of state of Revolutionary Serbia and the independent monarchies; Principality of Serbia and Kingdom of Serbia, as well as Socialist Republic of Serbia, a constituent country of the Socialist Federal Republic of Yugoslavia and heads of state of the Republic of Serbia (1992–2006), a constituent country of the Federal Republic of Yugoslavia / State Union of Serbia and Montenegro. Between 1944 and 1974, Serbia's head of state was the speaker of the Serbian parliament.

Monarchy

Revolutionary Serbia (1804–1813)

Principality of Serbia (1815–1882)

Kingdom of Serbia (1882–1918)

Republic

Socialist Republic of Serbia (1944–1992)
SR Serbia within Democratic Federal Yugoslavia and Socialist Federal Republic of Yugoslavia.

Republic of Serbia (1992–2006)
Republic of Serbia within Federal Republic of Yugoslavia and the State Union of Serbia and Montenegro.

Republic of Serbia (independent country, 2006–present)
Republic of Serbia became an independent state on 5 June 2006.

See also
List of Serbian monarchs
President of Serbia
List of presidents of Serbia
Prime Minister of Serbia
List of heads of state of Yugoslavia
President of Serbia and Montenegro

Notes

External links
 List of Serbian heads of state and government
 The President of the Republic of Serbia
 Serbian Royal Family

Serbia

Heads of state